Berke Gürbüz (born 27 January 2003) is a Turkish footballer who plays as a forward for Etimesgut Belediyespor on loan from Gaziantep.

Professional career
Gürbüz made his debut with Ankaragücü in a 5–0 Süper Lig loss to Alanyaspor on 30 November 2019. On 23 August 2021, he transferred to Gaziantep, signing a 5 year contract.

References

External links
 
 

2003 births
People from Gölbaşı, Ankara
Living people
Turkish footballers
Turkey youth international footballers
Association football forwards
MKE Ankaragücü footballers
Gaziantep F.K. footballers
FK Sloboda Tuzla players
Süper Lig players
Turkish expatriate footballers
Expatriate footballers in Bosnia and Herzegovina
Turkish expatriate sportspeople in Bosnia and Herzegovina